is a town located on Okinoerabujima, in Ōshima District, Kagoshima Prefecture, Japan.

As of June 2013, the town has an estimated population of 6,929 and a population density of 172 persons per km². The total area is 40.37  km².

Geography
Wadomari is located on the northern end of Okinoerabujima.

Climate
The climate is classified as humid subtropical (Köppen climate classification Cfa) with very warm summers and mild winters. Precipitation is high throughout the year, but is highest in the months of May, June and September. The area is subject to frequent typhoons.

Surrounding municipalities
China

History
Wadamori Village was founded on 1 April 1908. It was upgraded to town status on 1 May 1941. As with all of Okinoerabujima, the town came under the administration of the United States from 1 July 1946 to 25 December 1953.

Economy
Sugar cane, sweet potato, and peanut farming are popular. Floriculture is also practiced. However, due to the lack of local jobs, there has been an outflow of residents.

Transportation
Wadomari Port is the main ferry port on the island, with connections to the prefectural capital Kagoshima. It takes between 17 and 18 hours. Okinoerabu Airport, is located in Wadomari. Wadomari is located on Kagoshima Prefectural Route 84.

Education
Junior high schools:
 Shirogaoka Junior High School (JA)
 Wadomari Junior High School (JA)

Elementary schools include:
 Kunigami Elementary School (国頭小学校)
 Naishi Elementary School (内城小学校)
 Oshiro Elementary School (大城小学校)
 Wadomari Elementary School (和泊小学校)

, located in China, is operated by the Kagoshima Prefectural government. It was formed in 1949 through the merger of China High School and Wadomari High School. It initially had separate campuses in China and Wadomari.

Notes

External links

Official website in Japanese

Towns in Kagoshima Prefecture
Populated coastal places in Japan